"All for Us" is a song originally written, produced, and performed by English singer Labrinth, released as a single from the former's album Imagination & the Misfit Kid on 30 June 2019 through Syco Music. A reworked version of the song was featured heavily in the American teen drama Euphoria with vocals from star Zendaya  where it appeared on the first season's soundtrack and won Labrinth the Primetime Emmy Award for Outstanding Original Music and Lyrics.

Background and composition
"All for Us" comprises "vocal choruses and gritty synths to create a dreadful atmosphere that's quickly contrasted with a lovesick chorus". It depicts him as "determined to make things work between him and his partner" as he "reflects on his parents' poor marriage". A reworked version, which features American actress and singer Zendaya, was released in August. The reworked version appeared on Labrinth's second studio album, Imagination & the Misfit Kid. It has been described as "dark and epic, with a buzzing bass and chanting vocals".

Appearances in other media
"All for Us" appeared during the season 1 finale of the American teen drama series Euphoria. Zendaya, who stars in the series, performed the song during the episode. It is set to a scene in which her character is "transported to another world", "propped up by a crowd of dancers", and "rises, then falls into their arms". For this scene, the song won a Primetime Emmy Award for Outstanding Original Music and Lyrics in 2020.

Charts

Certifications

References

External links

2019 singles
2019 songs
Gospel songs
Labrinth songs
Songs from television series
Song recordings produced by Labrinth
Songs written by Labrinth
Syco Music singles
Zendaya songs